Wookiees are fictional humanoid aliens in the Star Wars universe, native to the forest planet Kashyyyk. They are distinguished from humans by their gigantism, hirsutism, and physical strength. The most prominent Wookiee is Chewbacca, co-pilot of the Millennium Falcon alongside his best friend Han Solo.

Inspiration
According to an interview with creator George Lucas, the inspiration for the Wookiee was Lucas's dog, Indiana (whose name is used in Lucas's Indiana Jones movies): "He was the prototype for the Wookiee. He always sat beside me in the car. He was big, a big bear of a dog." During the climactic chase scene in THX 1138, one of the robotic cops, voiced by actor Terry McGovern, improvises: "I think I ran over a Wookiee back there", and thus the word was born. "Wookey" was the surname of a friend of Terry's, Ralph Wookey, and Terry thought it would be a funny in-joke to include his friend's name in the soundtrack for THX-1138.

In one episode of Animal Planet's series Animal Icons, focusing on the creation of Star Wars figures, it was revealed that the Wookiees were also based on orangutans and lemurs, which are long-haired creatures that live in a hot forest climate. The net effect in terms of the Wookiees' appearance is a marked resemblance to descriptions of the legendary Sasquatch of the Pacific Northwest.

Depiction

Physical characteristics
Adult Wookiees are typically taller than most humans, averaging . They possess enormous strength; Solo states that a Wookiee can pull a man's arms out of his sockets if angered or slighted, and in books and comics no humanoid species is shown to equal a Wookiee in pure strength. Wookiees have a keen sense of smell, are fully covered with a thick coat of hair (though some can be susceptible to balding), have good hand–eye coordination, and are shown to be excellent marksmen. Wookiees have been shown in many diverse environments, such as those of Hoth, Tatooine, and Endor, never wearing any protective clothing or showing any signs of discomfort. Wookiees have a lifespan of several hundred years: Chewbacca is 200 years old during the original trilogy, and is still in his prime. Chewie also appeared twenty years before at the end of the prequel trilogy, and thirty years later in the sequel trilogy, yet his appearance does not significantly change across this fifty years time span.

Culture
Wookiees are devoted, loyal friends and are very distrustful of strangers. Life debt is sacred to them.

Despite a fearsome appearance and temperamental disposition, Wookiees are very intelligent and are very adept at handling advanced technology. Chewbacca is co-pilot of and performs maintenance on the Millennium Falcon, and also possesses a working knowledge of robotics, managing to haphazardly reassemble C-3PO after he was destroyed by Imperial stormtroopers in The Empire Strikes Back. Wookiees are fast learners; Chewbacca commandeers an Imperial AT-ST during the Battle of Endor and is shown effectively maneuvering the vehicle and operating its weapons systems. He also fought during the Clone Wars alongside Jedi Grand Master Yoda. Chewbacca is also shown to be an adept strategist at holo-chess (leading to his surprise when RD-D2 outmaneuvered him in a game). 

Wookiee cities on their home planet Kashyyyk, as seen in Revenge of the Sith, are built atop giant forest trees. Their society contains a mixture of traditional, almost primitive-appearing woodwork and decorations intermixed with starships and energy generators.

Due to their heavy coats of long fur, Wookiees do not generally wear clothes - though for practical purposes they will wear toolbelts, etc. Matching the anachronistic appearance of their cities, a Wookiee such as Chewbacca resembles a primitive humanoid bear wearing only a bandolier, containing high-tech energy cartridges for his blaster.

Wookiees greatly value morality, courage, compassion, and loyalty. A sacred and ancient Wookiee tradition is that of the honor family. An honor family is composed of a Wookiee's closest friends and companions. These family members pledge a commitment to lay down their lives for one another, as well as members of any honor families these individuals may have. Like the similarly sacred Wookiee life debt, Wookiees are willing to extend this tradition to members outside their species. Chewbacca considered Han Solo, Leia Organa Solo, their children, and Luke Skywalker part of his honor family. In the Solo film, Han says that the Wookiee words for "tribe/friends" and "family" are so similar he has trouble distinguishing them, apparently, Wookiees themselves don't recognize a significant difference between the two.

Life Day was a Wookiee time-honored holiday that celebrated family, joy, and harmony - values and tenets of Wookiee culture. Life Day celebrations involved a wearing red robes and journeying to the Tree of Life, which represented the first seed and spark of life on the Wookiee homeworld of Kashyyyk, the tree was decorated with Life Day Orbs and rituals and song were conducted around it. At the end of the celebrations the Wookiees would have a feast with food foraged from the forests of Kashyyyk, in the days before the celebrations. After the oppressive days of the Galactic Empire, Life Day became an annual holiday held after Autumn celebrated throughout the galaxy .

Wookiees have an understanding of Star Wars-universe warfare and fought alongside Republic forces during the Clone Wars. Wookiees were betrayed and enslaved shortly after that conflict, as well as on certain occasions during the war by the Separatist Alliance.

Some Wookiees are sensitive to the Force. One such Wookiee is Lowbacca, Chewbacca's nephew, from the book series Young Jedi Knights, although that story is no longer considered canon. However, a young Wookiee named Gungi, who appeared in Star Wars: The Clone Wars, was a Jedi youngling.

Some Wookiees are also prominent and successful bounty hunters, due to their strength and ferocity. One example is Black Krrsantan, a former gladiator and now assassin for hire, though he is considered a dishonorable outcast from Wookiee society.

Language
The most common Wookiee language is Shyriiwook. However, other dialects used by Wookiees from Kashyyyk are Thykarann and Xaczik. Wookiees are capable of understanding Galactic Basic, but generally none are able to speak it because of the structure of Wookiee vocal cords. In the original Star Wars trilogy, it seems that Chewbacca can understand humans. His human partner, Han Solo, also shows knowledge of Shyriiwook, or can at least understand Chewbacca; in Solo it is shown that Han does indeed have the ability to speak Shyriiwook at a rudimentary level. In the Star Wars expanded universe novels, Chewbacca builds a miniature translator droid ("Em Teedee") for his nephew Lowbacca when he later begins training as a Jedi, to facilitate communications with his fellow students.

Weapons
In the Star Wars films, Chewbacca carries a "bowcaster", the traditional weapon developed and used by Wookiees. Bowcasters launch quarrels, which are crossbow bolts that through magnetic propulsion appear as elongated blaster bolts due to their velocity. The propulsion technique gives the quarrels extremely high stopping power. Chewbacca in particular is shown to be an excellent shot, killing a Stormtrooper who was attempting to escape on a speeder bike in Return of the Jedi. The spring that powers the bowcaster is extremely hard to pull back; humans are generally incapable of cocking a bowcaster, although Han Solo was seen to do so.

Home planet

Kashyyyk, also known as Wookiee Planet C, is a fictional planet in the Star Wars universe. It is the tropical, forested home world of the Wookiees.

In the original scripts for Return of the Jedi, the Second Death Star was to be built in orbit around Kashyyyk by Wookiee slave labor, with the primitive Wookiees ultimately helping the rebels to fight off the Imperial garrison.  However, Lucas decided that since the Wookiee Chewbacca, being co-pilot and mechanic on the Millennium Falcon, was clearly proficient with advanced technology, it would be confusing to show the Wookiees with a primitive, "Stone Age" culture. Endor and the Ewoks were created instead to serve this purpose.

Lucas has also said that he originally planned Yavin IV, the location of the rebel base in Star Wars Episode IV: A New Hope, to be the Wookiee home planet of Kashyyyk, but subsequent rewrites changed this.

In media

Films
Kashyyyk was first seen in the Star Wars Holiday Special (1978), as the program's frame story takes place there, with the backdrop of the planet being taken directly from concept art by Ralph Mcquarrie. In the Holiday Special, the first mention of the planet carries the pronunciation "ka-ZOOK".

The planet was more extensively seen in Star Wars: Episode III – Revenge of the Sith, in which Jedi Master Yoda goes to Kashyyyk to aid the Wookiees in their battle against the Droid Army. In Revenge of the Sith the Wookiees live in the lush forests and giant jungles on the planet, in villages among the giant wroshyr trees. Phuket, Thailand was used for main photography, while the backdrops for Kashyyyk were filmed in Guilin, a city in southern China, which is famous for its karst formations.

Books
The planet's unique biosphere was first detailed in The Wookiee Storybook. The planet was revealed to be a densely forested planet, on which one can encounter vast plains and island areas suitable for large, sweeping battles. It was in this book that the family of Chewbacca once again appears in a situation similar to that of the Holiday Special. The planet appears in several other books, as well. Among them are:
 A Forest Apart by Troy Denning
 The Han Solo Trilogy, by Ann C. Crispin. While the reader actually visits Kashyyyk for the first time in Book Three ("Rebel Dawn"), we hear about it (and meet Chewbacca) in Book Two, "The Hutt Gambit".
 The Black Fleet Crisis trilogy by Michael P. Kube-McDowell
 Heir to the Empire by Timothy Zahn
 the Young Jedi Knights series
 the New Jedi Order series by various authors

Comics
Kashyyyk also features in issue #91 of the Marvel Comics Star Wars and in the newspaper comic strip "The Kashyyyk Depths", by artist Russ Manning. In the "Chewbacca" comic series, set during the New Jedi Order era, many scenes are set on Kashyyyk as well. It is written as 'Kazhyyk' in Way of the Wookiee! in the Marvel Illustrated Books. November 1981. 

Video games
Kashyyyk also appears in the video games Star Wars: Galaxies, Star Wars: Galactic Battlegrounds, Star Wars: Battlefront, Star Wars: Battlefront II, Star Wars: Republic Commando, Star Wars: The Clone Wars, Star Wars: Empire at War, Lego Star Wars: The Video Game, Lego Star Wars: The Complete Saga, Star Wars: The Force Unleashed, Star Wars Battlefront II, and Star Wars: Knights of the Old Republic. The latter takes place 4000 years before the Galactic Empire, with the Wookiees being oppressed by the slavers of Czerka Corporation. In addition, Kashyyyk appears in the 2019 video game Star Wars Jedi: Fallen Order.

Theme park attraction
Kashyyyk also appears in the various Disney theme parks attraction Star Tours – The Adventures Continue.

Fictional history

Early days
In the millennia before the rise of the Galactic Republic, Kashyyyk was a member world of the Infinite Empire. Its surface was terraformed by the Rakata, resulting in the abnormally large foliage which still covers the planet's surface in modern times. Its ecology can be politely described as a "layered deathtrap", the planet's surface being encompassed in shadow by wroshyr trees that are many miles high. The dangerous and hostile animals increase closer to the forest floor. Hidden on the planet's surface is a Star Map, another piece in the puzzle of the location of the Star Forge.

Czerka Corporation and slavery
When Kashyyyk was discovered by the Czerka Corporation's explorers, around 4,000 BBY (Before the Battle of Yavin), it was given the catalogue name G5-623, sometimes known as Edean. Czerka conducted extensive Wookiee-slaving operations on "Edean", as well as hunting several of its species almost to extinction.

To ensure a relatively peaceful presence, Czerka supported the installation of friendly chieftains into power over the native tribes and would then prop them up with mercenaries and weapons shipments. In response, the chieftains would train their tribe to understand Galactic Basic (ostensibly to "know thine enemy" but in reality to make them better slaves) and allow Czerka to enslave a percentage of the tribe's population. Eventually Czerka was driven out by Revan and rebel Wookiees.

The Clone Wars
During the epic Clone Wars of 22 to 19 years BBY, Kashyyyk fought on the side of the Galactic Republic. During one such battle, Yoda of the Jedi Council flew to Kashyyyk to assist in the fighting. This particular battle, known as the Battle of Kashyyyk, would be one of the last few battles fought in the Clone Wars before the fall of the Republic and the rise of the Empire. During this battle, Order 66 was initiated and Commander Gree, along with an unidentified Clone Scout Trooper, attempted to kill Yoda. The clone duo failed to kill the Jedi master and they were both decapitated. Yoda later escaped with the help from his friends and prominent Wookiees, Chewbacca and Tarfful. After this, the clones successfully defended the planet from Separatist advances. Quinlan Vos (who survived, but was wounded) was on Kashyyyk during Order 66, as was Luminara Unduli (who was killed by Commander Faie). Also, unknown to some, just before Order 66 was given, an elite squad of clones known as Delta Squad had arrived, delaying the Separatist forces advance on Kashyyyk, before the arrival of Republic reinforcements.

The "Dark Times"
During the period of the Galactic Empire's reign, Kashyyyk, like all other planets in the galaxy, was forced into obeying the policies of the Empire. On one such occasion, following the destruction of the first Death Star, the Empire, under the direction of Darth Vader, went on a search for the rebels responsible. Kashyyyk was put under a blockade, along with Tatooine, in an attempt to locate Han Solo and Chewbacca. It was on a day when Chewbacca was returning home to his family to celebrate the sacred Wookiee holiday of Life Day that the Empire raided Chewie's home. They did not find him.

Darth Vader also discovers his secret apprentice Galen Marek while raiding Kashyyyk in The Force Unleashed.

On another such occasion, the Rebel Alliance, before the destruction of the first Death Star, attempted to raid the planet with Han Solo. The plan is to free the Wookiee population from enslavement. The Empire stops them. Han Solo flees in the Millennium Falcon.

The New Republic
Following the defeat of the Empire, Kashyyyk joined the New Republic and its successor state the Galactic Alliance, formed by the leaders of the Rebel Alliance. In the novel Inferno, large portions of Kashyyyk are destroyed in retaliation for their acceptance of several Jedi who opposed Darth Caedus's regime.

Notable Wookiees

Chewbacca 
Chewbacca is the loyal friend of Han Solo, and serves as first mate and co-pilot on Solo's starship, the Millennium Falcon. As such, he appears in seven of the main Star Wars films, episodes III through IX, as well as in Solo: A Star Wars Story. He swore a life-debt to Han Solo and accompanied him on his smuggling career only visiting his family once a year for "Life Day" celebrations.

Itchy, Chewbacca's father, is a wookiee chieftain aged 350–375 years old who lived during the last centuries of the Galactic Empire. He lived in a treehouse with his daughter-in-law and grandson. He liked to carve wooden toys for his grandson Lumpy. He also liked to use a "mind evaporator" for entertainment. In his later years, he served in the Battle of Kashyyyk during the Clone Wars.

Lumpy is the son of Chewbacca and his wife Malla. As a child, Lumpy was raised by his mother and grandfather, Itchy, while Chewbacca served his life debt to Han Solo. In 1 ABY, Lumpy was at home with his family on Life Day as they prepared to receive Chewbacca and Han Solo for a celebration donning red robes under the Tree of Life. Afterwards, Lumpy and his family returned to their treehouse for a Life Day feast.

Malla is the wife of Chewbacca and mother to their son Lumpy. However she did not see much of her husband, due to the life debt he had to Han Solo. Despite this, Chewbacca returned once per year (with Han's blessing) to celebrate Life Day with the family. Malla enjoyed cooking and was known for her meal of "bantha surprise", and her famous "Wookiee-ookies".

Lowbacca is a Jedi Knight and the nephew of Chewbacca. He studied at Luke Skywalker's Jedi Praxeum and was a companion of Jaina Solo. He wielded a bronze-bladed lightsaber.

Gungi 
Gungi is a male Wookiee who is training to be a Jedi. Gungi appears in Star Wars: The Clone Wars. Gungi was trained by Ahsoka Tano and was in the top of his class. He is set to appear in season 2 of Star Wars: The Bad Batch.

Krrsantan 
Black Krrsantan first appeared in the Darth Vader comic series as an antagonist, and later appeared in The Book of Boba Fett, where he is an assassin for the Hutt Twins. He attacked Boba Fett while he slept in his bacta tank.

"Let the Wookiee win"
In A New Hope, when Chewbacca is upset after losing a game of dejarik (a game similar to chess) against R2-D2, Han Solo says "It's not wise to upset a Wookiee...droids don't pull people's arms out of their sockets when they lose. Wookiees are known to do that". In response C-3PO says "I suggest a new strategy, R2: let the Wookiee win". This phrase (sometimes referred to by its initialism LTWW) has gained the proverbial meaning of "In trivial disputes, let the person who cares more have their way." It can also be interpreted as advice to avoid arguments, especially those with shallow motivation such as to appear more intelligent than one's opponent. The phrase and the attitude it describes have been criticized as potentially justifying the enabling of an abuser.

References

External links

 
 

Fictional characters with superhuman strength
Fictional extraterrestrial life forms
Fictional humanoids
Fictional mammals
Fictional slaves
Fictional warrior races
Star Wars species